Robert Fuest (30 September 1927 – 21 March 2012) was an English film director, screenwriter, and production designer who worked mostly in the horror, fantasy and suspense genres.

Biography
Born in London, Fuest served his national service in post-war Germany with the Royal Air Force, air-lifting coal over the Berlin Wall, after which he attended Wimbledon and Hornsey Schools of Art. For a period, he lectured at Southampton College of Art. Fuest also spent time as a drummer in a warm-up band for Chris Barber and George Melly.

In the early sixties, he designed sets for television programmes such as ITV Play of the Week and Armchair Theatre. It was whilst working on the first season of The Avengers for director Peter Hammond that Fuest developed an enthusiasm for directing. Fuest later admitted (on a DVD commentary for the Avengers episode "Game") that Hammond's visual style proved a major influence, and opened him up to the stylistic possibilities of film and TV.

In 1965, he contributed material to the Peter Cook and Dudley Moore comedy sketch show Not Only... But Also.

His first film was Just Like a Woman (1967), which he also wrote, starring Wendy Craig. His work on the film brought him to the attention of Avengers producer Albert Fennell, who offered him the chance to direct episodes. He directed seven episodes in total: "My Wildest Dream", "Game", "They Keep Killing Steed", "The Rotters", "Take Me to Your Leader", "Pandora" and "Take Over". When the series was later revived as The New Avengers, Fuest was invited back to direct two more episodes, namely "The Midas Touch" and "The Tale of the Big Why".

In further television work, Fuest handled productions on both sides of the Atlantic, including Revenge of the Stepford Wives, ABC Weekend Special, ABC Afterschool Specials, The Doombolt Chase, C.A.T.S. Eyes, Worlds Beyond and The Optimist

Fuest's later films feature strong black comedy elements, including cult favorites The Abominable Dr. Phibes (1971), Dr. Phibes Rises Again (1972) (which he co-wrote), and The Final Programme (also known as The Last Days of Man on Earth; 1973). In addition to directing The Final Programme, he also wrote the screenplay and designed the sets.

His other films include And Soon the Darkness (1970), a suspense thriller written by Avengers writers Brian Clemens and Terry Nation, and The Devil's Rain (1975), a horror film shot in Mexico. The latter movie received such scathing reviews it may have ended his career, as Fuest immediately thereafter found himself relegated to directing fairly anonymous television work. His only subsequent theatrical release was Aphrodite (1982), a softcore sex movie filmed in Greece.

During his retirement, he focused on his passion for painting (he had exhibited at the Royal Academy since 1951) and also lectured at the London International Film School.

Selected filmography
 Just Like a Woman (1967)
 Wuthering Heights (1970)
 And Soon the Darkness (1970)
 The Abominable Dr. Phibes (1971)
 Dr. Phibes Rises Again (1972)
 The Final Programme (1973)
 The Devil's Rain (1975)
 Three Dangerous Ladies (1977)
 Revenge of the Stepford Wives (1980)
 Aphrodite (1982)

References

Bibliography

 

 Humphreys, Justin, with contributions by Mark Ferelli, Sam Irvin, and David Taylor (2018). The Dr. Phibes Companion. Albany, Georgia: BearManor Media. .

External links
 
Robert Fuest in Epdlp

1927 births
2012 deaths
English film directors
English screenwriters
English male screenwriters
Horror film directors
Writers from London
British production designers
Alumni of Wimbledon College of Arts